Joseph Bernard Shannon (March 17, 1867 – March 28, 1943) was a Democratic political boss in Kansas City, Missouri, who was a rival to the more dominant James Pendergast political machine in the late 19th and the early 20th centuries.

Early life
Joseph Bernard Shannon was born on March 17, 1867, in St. Louis, Missouri, and moved in his youth to Girard, Kansas. His father died in Girard from an accident. He moved to Kansas City, Missouri, in 1879 where he was a constable and a city-market master, and he attended night school at Central High School and Spalding Business College. He studied law, was admitted to the bar in 1905.

Career
Shannon began to practice law in Kansas City.

His faction was called the "rabbits" because its power base derived from those who lived along the Missouri River and the Kansas River. His rival was the "goats" and derived its power from those living in the hills of Kansas City and was headed by James Pendergast and then his brother Tom Pendergast.

Shannon was chairman of the Democratic State Convention in 1910; delegate to the Democratic National Conventions in 1908, 1912, 1920, 1924, 1928, 1932, and 1940; and member of the Missouri Constitutional Conventions in 1922 and 1923. He was elected as a Democrat to the U.S. House of Representatives, serving from March 4, 1931 to January 3, 1943. Shannon was known as a scholar of Thomas Jefferson and would speak about his life and his teachings.

Personal life
Shannon married Celia J. Hutawa on November 22, 1892. They had two children, Frank and Mrs. John F. Deveney.

Shannon died on March 28, 1943, in Kansas City following a heart ailment and pneumonia. He is buried in Calvary Cemetery in Kansas City.

References

External links

1867 births
1943 deaths
Politicians from St. Louis
Pendergast era
Democratic Party members of the United States House of Representatives from Missouri
People from Girard, Kansas